Fort Washington Avenue is a major north-south street in the Washington Heights neighborhood of Manhattan. It runs from Fort Tryon Park to 159th Street, where it intersects with Broadway. It goes past Bennett Park, the highest natural point in Manhattan. Famous residents of Fort Washington Avenue include Drs. Henry Kissinger and Ruth Westheimer, TV's "Doctor Ruth".

Transportation connections
The IND Eighth Avenue Line of the New York City Subway runs underneath Fort Washington Avenue, stopping at the 175th Street, 181st Street, and 190th Street stations. The avenue is served by the  buses.

Streets in Manhattan
Washington Heights, Manhattan